A list of films produced by the Marathi language film industry based in Maharashtra in the year 1935.

1935 Releases
A list of Marathi films released in 1935.

References

External links
Gomolo - 

Lists of 1935 films by country or language
1935
1935 in Indian cinema